Summer of Soul (...Or, When the Revolution Could Not Be Televised) is a 2021 American independent documentary film about the 1969 Harlem Cultural Festival, directed by Ahmir "Questlove" Thompson in his directorial debut. It had its world premiere at the 2021 Sundance Film Festival on January 28, 2021, where it won the Grand Jury Prize and Audience Award in the documentary categories. It had a limited theatrical release in the U.S. by Searchlight Pictures on June 25, 2021, before expanding and being released for streaming on Hulu the next weekend.

The film received acclaim from critics, with particular praise given to the restoration of the footage used. It won numerous awards, including Best Documentary Feature at the 6th Critics' Choice Documentary Awards, where it won in all six categories in which it was nominated, Best Documentary at the 75th British Academy Film Awards, Best Documentary Feature at the 94th Academy Awards, and Best Music Film at the 64th Annual Grammy Awards.

Synopsis
The film examines the 1969 Harlem Cultural Festival, which took place on six Sundays between June 29 and August 24 at Mount Morris Park (now Marcus Garvey Park) in Harlem, using professional footage of the festival that was filmed as it happened, stock news footage, and modern-day interviews with attendees, musicians, and other commentators to provide historical background and social context. Despite its large attendance and performers such as Stevie Wonder, Mahalia Jackson, Nina Simone, the 5th Dimension, the Staple Singers, Gladys Knight & the Pips, Mavis Staples, Blinky Williams, Sly and the Family Stone, and the Chambers Brothers, the festival is much less well-known in the 21st century than is Woodstock (which took place on the same weekend as one of the days of the Harlem Cultural Festival), and the filmmakers investigate this, among other topics.

Production

At the request of festival organizer and host Tony Lawrence, television producer Hal Tulchin recorded about 40 hours of footage of the 1969 Harlem Cultural Festival on videotape, excerpts from which were packaged as two one-hour TV specials that were broadcast in 1969, one on CBS in July, and one on ABC in September. The tapes were then placed in a basement, where they sat for the next 50 years. Tulchin attempted to interest broadcasters in the recordings for several years, but had little success, though some of the footage of Nina Simone was eventually used in documentaries about her.

In 2004, Joe Lauro, a film archivist at the Historic Films Archive, discovered the existence of the footage and contacted Hal Tulchin, hoping to work on a film about the festival. He digitized and cataloged the footage and, in 2006, entered into a deal with Robert Gordon and Morgan Neville to make the film, but the project never saw the light of day, as Tulchin discontinued his agreement with Lauro. Producer Robert Fyvolent, who had originally sought to work with Lauro, then acquired film and television rights to the footage from Tulchin. Fyvolent began collaborating with producer David Dinerstein in 2016, and together they engaged RadicalMedia and editor Josh Pearson, and added a third producer, Joseph Patel.

Director Ahmir Thompson has expressed surprise that the footage sat for so long, and that he had never heard of the festival before the producers approached him about making the film. Discussing its obscurity, he said: "What would have happened if this was allowed a seat at the table? How much of a difference would that have made in my life? That was the moment that extinguished any doubt I had that I could do this."

Release
The film premiered on January 28, 2021, at the Sundance Film Festival, where it won the Grand Jury Prize and Audience Award in the US Documentary Competition. It was acquired by Searchlight Pictures and Hulu, and was released in the United States at the El Capitan Theatre in Los Angeles and the AMC Magic Johnson Harlem 9 multiplex in New York City on June 25, 2021, before expanding nationwide and being released for streaming on Hulu the next weekend. The film was set to be distributed internationally in theaters and on Disney+ Hotstar on July 30, 2021, and on Disney+ and Star+ on November 19, 2021, and was made available on the U.S. version of Disney+ on February 8, 2022, in time for Black History Month. It made its broadcast television premiere on ABC on February 20, 2022. On February 8, 2022, 20th Century Studios released a hard copy on Standard Definition DVD. In a bonus feature interview, Thompson mused about expanding the film with the wealth of material he had to cut for time.

On April 22, 2021, it was announced that Thompson would introduce the first trailer for the film during the 93rd Academy Awards, for which he served as music director. The trailer debuted on April 25, 2021.

Reception

Box office
Summer of Soul grossed $2.3 million in the U.S. and Canada, and $1.4 million in other territories, for a worldwide total of $3.7 million.

In the film's first weekend in wide release, it grossed $650,000 from 752 theaters (for a per-venue average of $865).

Critical response
On Rotten Tomatoes, the film has an approval rating of 99% (based on 220 reviews), with an average rating of 9.1/10; the website's critics consensus reads: "Deftly interweaving incredible live footage with a series of revealing interviews, Summer of Soul captures the spirit and context of a watershed moment while tying it firmly to the present." On Metacritic, the film has a weighted average score of 96 out of 100 (based on 38 critics), indicating "universal acclaim". Audiences polled by CinemaScore gave the film a rare "A+" average grade.

Rolling Stone praised the film as "the Perfect Movie to Kick Off Sundance 2021" and said it was "an incredible, vital act of restoration—and reclamation". The Guardian gave it five stars, writing that there is "a moment so striking and rich with power at the center of Ahmir 'Questlove' Thompson's Summer of Soul (…Or, When The Revolution Could Not Be Televised) that, while watching it, I actually forgot to breathe."

British critic Mark Kermode called the film "the best music documentary I've ever seen" in his review for Kermode and Mayo's Film Review on BBC Radio 5 Live.

Awards and nominations

Soundtrack

On January 21, 2022, Legacy Records released an official soundtrack album. In an interview, Thompson said he considered including songs not in the film, but decided to stick with the music that had already been cleared for release. The digital version of the soundtrack contains 17 songs, while the physical version contains 16, as it does not feature Abbey Lincoln's and Max Roach's performance of "Africa".

Home media
On February 8, 2022, the film was released on Standard Definition DVD by 20th Century Studios. Bonus features include audio commentary by Thompson, who muses about reediting a longer version that would include footage he had to cut for time, and two behind-the-scenes featurettes ("Soul Searching" and "Harlem: Then & Now").

See also
Monterey Pop (1968)
Gimme Shelter (1970)
Festival (1967)

References

Further reading

External links
 For Questlove, The Pandemic Meant Embracing Quiet — And Buying A Farm July 21, 2021 radio interview with Terry Gross on Fresh Air
 
 
 
 Summer of Soul on MUBI

2021 films
2021 documentary films
2021 independent films
Documentary films about African Americans
American documentary films
Searchlight Pictures films
Hulu original films
Documentary films about music festivals
Sundance Film Festival award winners
Harlem Cultural Festival
Collage film
Best Documentary Feature Academy Award winners
2021 directorial debut films
Peabody Award-winning broadcasts
2020s English-language films
2020s American films